The 2016 United States House of Representatives election in Delaware was held on November 8, 2016, to elect the U.S. representative from the state of Delaware from Delaware's at-large congressional district. The election coincided with the 2016 U.S. presidential election, as well as other elections to the House of Representatives, elections to the United States Senate and various state and local elections. The primaries were held on September 13.

Democrat John Carney, the incumbent representative, did not run for reelection, instead successfully running for Governor of Delaware. Democrat Lisa Blunt Rochester won the open seat on November 8th.

Democratic primary
Democrats Bryon Short, a member of the Delaware House of Representatives from Highland Woods, and Bryan Townsend, a member of the Delaware Senate from Newark, Delaware, had previously said they would run for the seat if Carney ran for governor. Following Carney's announcement that he would run for governor, both Short and Townsend declared their candidacies in the race to succeed him. Lisa Blunt Rochester, the former State Labor Secretary, also joined the race. Short later withdrew from the race, citing difficulties fundraising. Rochester won the primary with 43.8% of the vote.

Candidates

Nominee
 Lisa Blunt Rochester, former State Labor Secretary, former State Personnel Director, and former CEO of the Metropolitan Wilmington Urban League

Eliminated in primary
 Bryan Townsend, state senator
 Sean Barney, former policy director for Governor Jack Markell and nominee for state treasurer in 2014
 Mike Miller, businessman and perennial candidate

Withdrawn
 Bryon Short, state representative

Declined
 Marla Blunt Carter, college professor and former congressional aide
 Chris Bullock, president of the New Castle County Council (running for re-election)
 John Carney, incumbent U.S. Representative (running for Governor)
 Jack Markell, Governor of Delaware
 Brenda Mayrack, former executive director of the Delaware Democratic Party and nominee for state auditor in 2014
 Collin O'Mara, president and CEO of the National Wildlife Federation and former State Natural Resources and Environmental Control Secretary
 Dennis E. Williams, former state representative and nominee in 1996 and 1998

Endorsements

Polling

Results

Republican primary
Hans Reigle, a former mayor of Wyoming, Delaware, and the former chairman of the Kent County Republican Party, ran unopposed on the ballot for the Republican nomination.

Candidates

Nominee
 Hans Reigle, former mayor of Wyoming and former chairman of the Kent County Republican Party

Failed to file
 Rose Izzo, conservative activist, candidate for the seat in 2010 and 2012 and nominee in 2014 (never filed for primary)

Polling

General election

Polling
{| class="wikitable"
|- valign= bottom
! Poll source
! Date(s)administered
! Samplesize
! Margin oferror
! style="width:100px;"| LisaBluntRochester (D)
! style="width:100px;"| HansReigle (R)
! style="width:40px;"| Other
! style="width:40px;"| Undecided
|-
| University of Delaware
| align=center| September 16–28, 2016
| align=center| 900
| align=center| ± 3.8%
|  align=center| 46%
| align=center| 26%
| align=center| 11%
| align=center| 18%

Results

References

External links
U.S. House election in Delaware, 2016 at Ballotpedia
Campaign contributions at OpenSecrets

Official campaign websites (Archived)
 Sean Barney (D) for Congress
 Lisa Blunt Rochester (D) for Congress
 Bryan Townsend (D) for Congress
 Rose Izzo for Congress
 Hans Reigle for Congress

House
Delaware
2016